Sound exposure is the integral, over time, of squared sound pressure. The SI unit of sound exposure is the pascal squared second (Pa2·s).

Mathematical definition
Sound exposure, denoted E, is defined by

where
the exposure is being calculated for the time interval between times t0 and t1;
p(t) is the sound pressure at time t, usually A-weighted for sound in air.

Sound exposure level

Sound exposure level (SEL) is a logarithmic measure of the sound exposure of a sound relative to a reference value.
Sound exposure level, denoted LE and measured in dB, is defined by

where
E is the sound exposure;
E0 is the reference sound exposure;
 is the neper;
 is the bel;
 is the decibel.

The commonly used reference sound exposure in air is

References

Sound measurements
Physical quantities